Marry a Rich Man is a 2002 Hong Kong movie directed by Vincent Kok.

Cast
 Sammi Cheng as Ah Mi
 Richie Jen as Christmas Yan
 Stefania De Peppe as Milan's city cop
 Maria Chen as Sonreysia
 Wah-Leung Chim as Wealthy Golfer
 Jan Lamb as Wilson
 Becky Lee as Chan Chai Chung
 Candy Lo as MT
 Terence Tsui as Uncle D's worker
 Wai-Keung Tung		
 Quinton Wong 		
 Bowie Wu as Uncle D

External links
 IMdB entry
 Hong Kong Cinemagic entry
HKMDB entry

Hong Kong romantic comedy-drama films
2002 films
2000s Hong Kong films